Vintilǎ Cristescu was a Romanian long-distance runner and a football player.

Career
Vintilă Cristescu was a football player in the 1910s at Colțea București. In 1920, together with Colțea București teammates Iacobescu and Puiu Pavel, they founded Colțea Brașov, a team that would win the national championship in the 1927–28 season with Cristescu as the team's leader. His long-distance runner career began in 1921 when he won the first national marathon race held in Romania, running 42,192 km. He went on to win the national marathon championship four more times (1923, 1925, 1926, 1927), also participating at the 1924 "Pannonian Games" and at the marathon from the 1928 Summer Olympics. 

Cristescu was also a colonel in the Romanian Army who fought in World War II with the Vânători de munte elite mountain troops. His father, captain Sava Cristescu, had fought in World War I at the Battle of Brașov.

References

External links
 

Year of birth missing
Year of death missing
Place of birth missing
Athletes (track and field) at the 1928 Summer Olympics
Romanian male long-distance runners
Romanian male marathon runners
Olympic athletes of Romania
Romanian footballers
Liga I players
Association footballers not categorized by position
Romanian military personnel of World War II